Blackboard Jungle is a 1955 American social drama film about an English teacher in an interracial inner-city school, based on the 1954 novel The Blackboard Jungle by Evan Hunter and adapted for the screen and directed by Richard Brooks. It is remembered for its innovative use of rock and roll in its soundtrack, for casting grown adults as high school teens, and for the unique breakout role of a black cast member, film icon Sidney Poitier, as a rebellious yet musically talented student.

In 2016, Blackboard Jungle was selected for preservation in the United States National Film Registry by the Library of Congress as being "culturally, historically, or aesthetically significant".

Factual background 
Hunter's novel was based on his early job as a teacher at Bronx Vocational High School, now known as Alfred E. Smith Career and Technical Education High School in the South Bronx. Hunter, then known as Salvatore Lombino, took the teaching job in 1950 after graduating from Hunter College. He was quickly disillusioned and quit in frustration after two months.

Plot

In the mid-1950s, Richard Dadier is a new teacher at North Manual Trades High School, an inner-city school of diverse ethnic backgrounds.  Led by student Gregory Miller, most engage in anti-social behavior. The school principal, Mr. Warneke, denies there are discipline issues, but the school faculty, particularly Mr. Murdock, warn Dadier otherwise. Dadier befriends two other new teachers, Joshua Edwards and Lois Hammond.

Dadier's class includes Miller and Artie West, a rebellious bully and gang leader. The class shows no respect for Dadier.  Dadier encourages Miller to lead the class in the right direction.  After Dadier subdues a student who attacks Miss Hammond, the class gives Dadier the silent treatment and are even more uncooperative. Dadier and Edwards are mugged by a gang that includes West.

Reluctant to quit, Dadier seeks advice from his former teacher, Professor Kraal, the principal of an academically superior school with disciplined students. Kraal offers Dadier a job, but he declines. After chastising his class for calling each other racially divisive names, Dadier is himself falsely accused by Mr. Warneke of using racial epithets in the classroom. West encounters Dadier during his gang's robbery of a newspaper truck. West tells Dadier his classroom is on the streets and to leave him alone. Several students, led by West, assault Edwards in his classroom and destroy his music record collection.

Dadier's wife, Anne, who is pregnant, begins receiving anonymous letters and phone calls telling her Dadier and Miss Hammond are having an affair. Dadier discovers Miller can play piano and sing, and wonders why Miller can show such talent but also be so rebellious. Dadier shows his class an animated film about "Jack and the Beanstalk" which sparks discussion about moral choices. Anne goes into premature labor caused by the stress of the phone calls about Dadier's alleged affair. When a neighbor shows Dadier the anonymous letters, he angrily decides to quit. Mr. Murdock encourages him to stay telling Dadier he is making progress and has inspired him too. Anne apologizes for doubting Dadier's loyalty in their marriage and says she was wrong for telling him to quit. Their premature baby boy, though weak, eventually thrives.

When Dadier observes West openly copying from another student, he demands that West bring his paper to the front to have it docked five points. West rebuffs his repeated request, but Dadier is unrelenting.  The conflict quickly escalates, and West pulls out a switchblade.  Dadier does not back down.  Miller stops another of the gang from jumping Dadier from behind.  The rest of West's gang fails to assist.

Dadier accuses West of the false allegations made to both Mr. Warneke and Anne. Dadier subdues West, and the other students join in to subdue classmate Belazi, who has picked up the knife to escape. Miller then leads the class in helping Dadier take West and Belazi to the principal's office. In the final scene, Miller and Dadier ask if the other is quitting at the end of the school year. Miller said no, because the two of them had a pact that neither would quit if the other stayed, and Dadier's expression makes clear he has no intention of breaking the agreement.

Cast

Cast notes:
 This was the debut film for Campos, Morrow, and Farah, and one of Poitier's earliest. Farah later changed his name to Jamie Farr, best known for playing Corporal Maxwell Q. Klinger in the M*A*S*H TV series.

Critical reception

Positive reviews

In a positive review, Bosley Crowther of The New York Times wrote: 

Variety called it: "...a film with a melodramatic impact that hits hard at a contemporary problem. The casting, too, is exceptionally good." Harrison's Reports called the film: "...a stark, powerful melodrama, sordid, tense, and disturbing. The picture no doubt will stir up considerable controversy, but at the same time it probably will prove to be a top box-office grosser."

John McCarten of The New Yorker wrote:

Negative reviews
Not all reviews were positive. Richard L. Coe of The Washington Post slammed the film as "so sensationalized as to negate any laudable purpose its supporters claim", further explaining: 

The Monthly Film Bulletin delivered a mixed to negative assessment:

Popular culture
The song "Rock Around the Clock" was included in the film, making the recording an anthem for rebellious 1950s youth. It was Number 1 on the pop charts for two months and went to Number 3 on the R&B chart.

Rotten Tomatoes gives the film a "fresh" rating of 76%. On their best of Sidney Poitier list, it says:

Box office
According to MGM records the film earned $5,292,000 in the US and Canada and $2,852,000 elsewhere.

Awards and honors

In 2010, Turner Classic Movies (TCM) listed the soundtrack of the movie on its list of the Top 15 Most Influential Movie Soundtracks of all time. TCM described the impact and the influence of the movie:

Cultural impact
The film marked the rock and roll revolution by featuring Bill Haley & His Comets' "Rock Around the Clock", initially a B-side, over the film's opening credits (with a lengthy drum solo introduction, unlike the originally released single), as well as in the first scene, in an instrumental version in the middle of the film, and at the close of the movie, establishing that song as an instant hit. The record had been released the previous year, gaining only limited sales. But, popularized by its use in the film, "Rock Around the Clock" reached number one on the Billboard charts and remained there for eight weeks. In some theaters, when the film was in the first release, the song was not heard at all at the beginning of the film because rock and roll was considered a bad influence. Despite this, other instances of the song were not cut.

This film is the source of the slang term "Daddy-O".  When the teacher, Mr Dadier (Glenn Ford), writes his name on the blackboard early in the film, one of the students throws a baseball and knocks a hole in the blackboard at the end of his name, Dadier becomes Dadi-O and the class erupts in laughter and calls him "Daddy-O".

The music led to a large teenage audience for the film, and their exuberant response to it sometimes overflowed into violence and vandalism at screenings. In this sense, the film has been seen as marking the start of a period of visible teenage rebellion in the latter half of the 20th century. The film was banned in Memphis, Tennessee and Atlanta, Georgia, with the Atlanta Review Board claiming that it was "immoral, obscene, licentious and will adversely affect the peace, health, morals and good order of the city".

The film marked a watershed in the United Kingdom and was originally refused a cinema certificate before being passed with heavy cuts. When shown at a south London cinema in Elephant and Castle in 1956 the teenage Teddy Boy audience began to riot, tearing up seats and dancing in the aisles. After that, riots took place around the country wherever the film was shown.

In 2007, the Journal of Criminal Justice and Popular Culture published an article that analyzed the film's connection to crime theories and juvenile delinquency.

In 2015, the Journal of Transnational American Studies published a study with a focus on the film's reception in West Germany and Japan.

The influential Jamaican reggae album Blackboard Jungle Dub (1973) by The Upsetters references the film's title.

The film touches on the still-current issue of teacher pay. The dialog states that in 1955, the pay for teachers was US$2.00 an hour, or about US$4,000 a year salary, as compared with congressmen and judges at US$9.25, policemen and firemen at US$2.75, carpenters at US$2.81, plumbers at US$2.97, and plasterers at US$3.21 an hour.

In March 2005, the 50th anniversary of the release of the film, which had influenced the subsequent upsurge in the general popularity of rock and roll, was marked by a series of "Rock Is Fifty" celebrations in Los Angeles and New York City, involving the surviving members of the original Bill Haley & His Comets.

In 2016, the film was selected for preservation in the United States National Film Registry by the Library of Congress.

Home media
The film was released on DVD in North America on May 10, 2005, by Warner Home Video.

See also

 List of American films of 1955
 In the 1967 film To Sir, with Love and its 1996 sequel, Sidney Poitier plays a teacher in a difficult school.
 List of hood films

References

Bibliography

External links

 
 
 
 

1955 films
1950s coming-of-age drama films
1950s teen drama films
American coming-of-age drama films
American teen drama films
American high school films
American rock music films
American black-and-white films
1950s English-language films
Films about educators
Films about juvenile delinquency
Films about teacher–student relationships
Films based on American novels
Films set in New York City
Bill Haley
Metro-Goldwyn-Mayer films
Films directed by Richard Brooks
Films produced by Pandro S. Berman
United States National Film Registry films
1955 drama films
Censored films
1950s American films
Films based on novels by Ed McBain